is an English unjust enrichment law case, concerning the method for determining the amount of a quantum meruit claim.  It was decided by the United Kingdom Supreme Court.

Facts
Mr Benedetti helped Mr Naguib Sawiris, as well as his company Cylo Investments Ltd and his family trusts April and OS Holding, to acquire an Italian telecoms company called Wind Telecommunicazioni SpA. On 31 January 2004 they drafted an ‘Acquisition Agreement’, however it contemplated a different way of doing the takeover. Mr Benedetti entered a brokerage agreement (through a company of his) by which he was paid a 0.55%, eventually €67 million. But this was merely for the job of brokering the purchase of shares itself, rather than the more general work of organising the takeover. Another company 60% owned by Benedetti got a €3.4m payment for support and expenses. On the remaining work, he requested a fee in May 2005. Benedetti wished to receive between €200m and €300m. He was told by Mr Sawiris' agent that no such deal was ever contemplated, but he would be offered €75.1m. Mr Benedetti wrote back that he was surprised, and "that in our venture i was a partner not a shity middle man" [sic]. They had further meetings but nothing was agreed, and Mr Benedetti sued for a quantum meruit for a fair value of his services.

Judgment

High Court
Patten J in the High Court held that Benedetti ought to receive €75.1 million on a quantum meruit, taking into account the rejected offer. The acquisition agreement was disregarded since it was abandoned, and Benedetti was ordered to pay costs on a standard basis, and interest was declined. Benedetti appealed asking the Acquisition Agreement to be taken into account, that the offer should not have been, and asking whether there should be a brokerage fee deduction, OS Holding’s liability, the costs and interest decisions.

Court of Appeal
The Court of Appeal reduced the award in the High Court to €14.52 million. Arden LJ gave the first judgment. Although prior agreements could be taken into account by a court to determine a quantum meruit, the "Acquisition Agreement" should not because the parties' themselves had disregarded it, and a different acquisition was contemplated by it. Benedetti's services were to be valued the day they were provided, at the market price. The brokerage fee he had received should be deducted, as the Judge had done.

Etherton LJ gave a concurring judgment.

Rimer LJ gave a judgment, concurring with Arden LJ.

Supreme Court
The Supreme Court held that Mr Benedetti was entitled to be paid at the market value for his services. He was not entitled to a further share of the profits from the takeover deal. Lord Clarke said the following.

See also

English unjust enrichment law
Britton v. Turner, 6 N.H. 481 (1834) an employee who left work on a farm after six months, but had contracted to be paid $120 at the end of one year, was entitled to receive some payment ($95) even though the contract was not completed.

Notes

References
Supreme Court case details

English unjust enrichment case law
Supreme Court of the United Kingdom cases
2013 in British law
2013 in case law